Texas Tommy is a 1928 American silent Western film directed by J.P. McGowan and starring Bob Custer, Mary Mayberry and Bud Osborne.

Cast
 Bob Custer as Bob Cooper 
 Mary Mayberry as Rancher's Daughter 
 Lynn Sanderson as Unknown 
 Bud Osborne as Henchman 
 Horace B. Carpenter as Rancher 
 Frank Ellis as Henchman 
 J.P. McGowan as Texas Tommy

References

Bibliography
 John J. McGowan. J.P. McGowan: Biography of a Hollywood Pioneer. McFarland, 2005.

External links
 

1928 films
1928 Western (genre) films
Films directed by J. P. McGowan
American black-and-white films
Silent American Western (genre) films
1920s English-language films
1920s American films